"Same Ol' Story" (also known as "Same Ol' Fuckin' Story") is a song by Cyndi Lauper, released as a single from her 2008 album Bring Ya to the Brink. It was written and produced by Lauper and New York City DJ Richard Morel. The song reached #1 on the Billboard Hot Dance Club Play chart, becoming Lauper's first single to top the chart since her 1983 hit "Girl Just Wanna Have Fun".

There is also a "clean version" available on iTunes which replaces the lyrics "Same ol' fucking story" with "Same ol', same ol' story". As of August 2009, the song has sold 5,000 downloads in the U.S.

Official mixes
Richard Morel Clean Original Mix Acapella – 5:42
Richard Morel Explicit Original Mix – 5:54
Richard Morel Clean Original Mix – 5:54
Richard Morel Extended Original Mix – 8:37
Ralphi Rosario Vocal Mix – 8:43
Ralphi Rosario Clean Vocal Mix - 8:44 (unreleased)
Ralphi Rosario Filter Dub – 9:17
Ralphi Rosario Radio Mix - 3:52 (unreleased)
Razor N Guido Vocal Mix – 9:30
Razor N Guido Dub - 6:31 (unreleased)
Richard Morel Extended Original Dub – 7:49
Richard Morel Deep Dub – 8:57
Rosabel Vocal Mix – 9:43
Rosabel Clean Vocal Mix - 9:44 (unreleased)

Charts

Weekly charts

References

2008 singles
Cyndi Lauper songs
Songs written by Cyndi Lauper
2008 songs
Songs written by Richard Morel
Epic Records singles